Elmar Darinel Díaz Solórzano (born 11 July 1969) is a Mexican politician affiliated with the Institutional Revolutionary Party. He served as Deputy of the LX Legislature of the Mexican Congress representing Chiapas.

In 2010 Díaz was convicted for the murder of his wife Tatiana Trujillo. He was freed in 2014.

References

1969 births
Living people
Politicians from Chiapas
Institutional Revolutionary Party politicians
21st-century Mexican politicians
Mexican people convicted of murder
Members of the Chamber of Deputies (Mexico) for Chiapas